Stanley Gene Cliburn (born December 19, 1956) is an American former professional baseball player and current manager of the Southern Maryland Blue Crabs of the Atlantic League of Professional Baseball. He was previous the manager of the New Britain Bees and the Rochester Red Wings, the Triple-A affiliate of the Minnesota Twins, from 2006 to 2009. Cliburn has also managed in the Arizona Fall League and at other levels in the minor leagues. He is the twin brother of former Major League pitcher Stu Cliburn, who remains a coach in the Twins' farm system.  Cliburn was most recently the manager of the New Britain Bees of the Atlantic League, an independent baseball league.

Playing career
Cliburn played one season in the majors with the California Angels in 1980 during which he appeared in 54 games at catcher, but he would play in over 948 minor league games during his fourteen-year playing career.

Coaching career
After his playing career ended Cliburn was hired as a manager for the Pittsburgh Pirates' New York-Penn League team, and he spent the next 12 seasons managing in the Pirates system, the Texas Rangers system, and for the Alexandria Aces of the independent Texas-Louisiana League. His pitching coach at New Britain for those five seasons was his twin brother Stu Cliburn. On October 18, 2005, Stan Cliburn was named as manager of the Rochester Red Wings, the Triple-A affiliate of the Twins. Initially, it was believed that Stu would not be promoted along with Stan; however, both were promoted to Rochester for the  season. In his first season at the helm in Rochester, Cliburn guided the Wings to a 79–64 record and came within one game of winning the Governors' Cup, the championship of the International League.

The 2006 season proved to be the most successful of Cliburn's tenure in Rochester. Additionally, following the  season, Stan was separated from Stu for the first time in eight years as Stu was reassigned to New Britain for 2009. On September 21, 2009, the Minnesota Twins announced that they would not renew manager Stan Cliburn's contract for the 2010 season. According to Twins farm director Jim Rantz, the change was made as part of an "overall directional change that is being implemented throughout the minor-league system."

After having success managing in the Arizona Fall League Cliburn was hired as the manager for the Sioux City Explorers of the independent American Association of Independent Professional Baseball where he served as manager for three seasons; he was let go by the Explorers following a disappointing season by the team in which they finished 38-62 and Cliburn was cited for a DUI in September 2013.

Cliburn returned to managing in 2015 when he became the manager of the Southern Maryland Blue Crabs of the independent Atlantic League. On December 15, 2015, Cliburn returned to New Britain as the first manager of the new Atlantic League team the New Britain Bees after the departure of the MLB-affiliated Rock Cats.

Personal life
Cliburn's twin brother, Stew, also played in the major leagues.

References

External links

Retrosheet
Venezuelan Professional Baseball League

 Stan Cliburn at SABR (Baseball BioProject)

1956 births
Living people
Alexandria Aces players
American expatriate baseball players in Canada
Baseball players from Mississippi
Bradenton Explorers players
Buffalo Bisons (minor league) players
California Angels players
Daytona Beach Explorers players
Edmonton Trappers players
El Paso Diablos players
Hawaii Islanders players
Idaho Falls Angels players
Leones del Caracas players
Lynn Pirates (1983) players
Major League Baseball catchers
Minor league baseball managers
Navegantes del Magallanes players
American expatriate baseball players in Venezuela
Portland Beavers players
Quad Cities Angels players
Richmond Braves players
Rochester Red Wings managers
Salinas Angels players
Salt Lake City Gulls players
Twin sportspeople
New Britain Bees